William Lawrence Hoskins (24 December 1828 – 8 March 1901) was a Democratic member of the Wisconsin State Assembly. He was elected in 1870 and 1871. Hoskins was born in North East, Pennsylvania and is buried at the Rock Lake Cemetery in Lake Mills, Wisconsin.

References

1828 births
1901 deaths
People from North East, Pennsylvania
People from Jefferson County, Wisconsin
Democratic Party members of the Wisconsin State Assembly
19th-century American politicians